Oxford Street is a major road in the City of Westminster in the West End of London, running from Tottenham Court Road to Marble Arch via Oxford Circus. It is Europe's busiest shopping street, with around half a million daily visitors, and as of 2012 had approximately 300 shops. It is designated as part of the A40, a major road between London and Fishguard, though it is not signed as such, and traffic is regularly restricted to buses and taxis.

The road was originally part of the Via Trinobantina, a Roman road between Essex and Hampshire via London. It was known as Tyburn Road through the Middle Ages when it was notorious for public hangings of prisoners at Tyburn Gallows. It became known as Oxford Road and then Oxford Street in the 18th century, and began to change from residential to commercial and retail use, attracting street traders, confidence tricksters and prostitution. Department stores began to dominate the streetscape from the early 20th century, the most imposing of all being Selfridges (which was begun in 1909). The street suffered heavy bombing during World War II, and several longstanding stores including John Lewis & Partners were completely destroyed and rebuilt from scratch.

Despite competition from out-of-town shopping centres and online retailers, Oxford Street remains in high demand as a retail location, with several chains having their flagship stores on the street, and has a number of listed buildings. Unlike nearby shopping streets such as Bond Street, it has retained an element of downmarket trading alongside more prestigious retail stores. The annual switching on of Christmas lights by a celebrity has been a popular event since 1959. As a popular retail area and main thoroughfare for London buses and taxis, Oxford Street has suffered from traffic congestion, pedestrian congestion, a poor safety record and pollution. Various traffic management schemes have been implemented by Transport for London (TfL) and others, including a ban on private vehicles during daytime hours on weekdays and Saturdays (in place since the 1970s), widened pavements and improved pedestrian crossings.

Location
The road begins at St Giles Circus as a westward continuation of New Oxford Street, meeting Charing Cross Road, Tottenham Court Road (next to Tottenham Court Road station). It runs past Rathbone Place, Wardour Street and Great Portland Street to Oxford Circus, where it meets Regent Street. From there it continues past New Bond Street, Bond Street station and Vere Street, ending at Marble Arch. The route continues as Bayswater Road and Holland Park Avenue towards Shepherd's Bush.

The road is within the London Congestion Charging Zone. It is part of the A40, most of which is a trunk road running from London to Fishguard (via Oxford, Cheltenham, Brecon and Haverfordwest). Like many roads in Central London that are no longer through routes, it is not signposted with that number. Numerous bus routes run along Oxford Street, including the 55, 73, 94, 98, 159, 390 and Night Buses N8, N55, N73, N98 and N207.

History

Early history

Oxford Street follows the route of a Roman road, the Via Trinobantina, which linked Calleva Atrebatum (near Silchester, Hampshire) with Camulodunum (now Colchester) via London and became one of the major routes in and out of the city.

Between the 12th century and 1782, it was variously known as Tyburn Road (after the River Tyburn that crossed it north to south), Uxbridge Road (the name still used for the road between Shepherd's Bush and Uxbridge), Worcester Road and Oxford Road. Tyburn, near where Marble Arch now stands, was a place of public execution from 1388 to 1783 and a set of gallows stood here. On Ralph Aggas' "Plan of London", published in the 16th century, the road is described partly as "The Waye to Uxbridge" followed by "Oxford Road", showing rural farmland at the present junction of Oxford Street and Rathbone Place. By 1678 it was known as the "King's Highway", and the "Road To Oxford" by 1682.

The Georgian era

Though a major coaching route, there were several obstacles along it, including the bridge over the Tyburn. A turnpike trust was established in the 1730s to improve upkeep of the road. It became notorious as the route taken by prisoners on their final journey from Newgate Prison to the gallows at Tyburn. Spectators jeered as the prisoners were carted along the road, and could buy rope used in the executions from the hangman in taverns. By about 1729, the road had become known as Oxford Street.

Development began in the 18th century after many surrounding fields were purchased by the Earl of Oxford. In 1739, a local gardener, Thomas Huddle, built property on the north side. After Lord Oxford's death the estate was inherited by his daughter the Duchess of Portland; it then passed down to successive Dukes as the Portland Estate, before becoming the Howard de Walden Estate in 1879 (by way of the 5th Duke's sister). The Howard de Walden Estate progressively sold off its Oxford Street holdings (which lay on the north side between Marylebone Lane and Wells Street) in the first half of the twentieth century. Other landowning estates held sway over the western end of Oxford Street: most of the northern side west of Duke Street was and is owned by the Portman Estate; while facing it (on the southern side) most of the land west of Davies Street was and is part of the Grosvenor estate. John Rocque's Map of London, published in 1746, shows urban buildings as far as North Audley Street (on the south side) and Marylebone Lane (on the north side), but only intermittent rural property beyond. Further development to the west occurred between 1763 and 1793, when building began on the Portman Estate. 

The Pantheon, a place for public entertainment, opened at No. 173 in 1772. The street became popular for entertainment including bear-baiters, theatres and public houses. However, it was not attractive to the middle and upper classes due to the nearby Tyburn gallows and the notorious St Giles rookery, or slum. The gallows were removed in 1783, and by the end of the century, Oxford Street was built up from St Giles Circus to Park Lane, containing a mix of residential houses, shops and places of entertainment. 

Oxford Circus was designed as part of the development of Regent Street by the architect John Nash in 1810. It was later rebuilt (the four quadrants of the circus as seen today were designed by Sir Henry Tanner and constructed between 1913 and 1928).

The Pantheon closed as an entertainment venue in 1814 (twenty years later it was reopened as a covered bazaar); this prompted another bazaar (across the road at No. 150) to close, and in 1836 the Princess's Theatre opened on the site. Several other places of entertainment would open in later years; but by this time shopping was well established as Oxford Street's main attraction.

Retail development

Oxford Street changed in character from residential to retail towards the end of the 18th century. Recording an evening visit to the street in 1786, Sophie von La Roche described a multitude of shops lit by Argand lamps behind 'handsome glass windows': confectioners, fruiterers, watchmakers, silversmiths, 'spirit booths' (selling strong drink), glass shops, china shops, silk shops, lamp shops and others. There were also clothing retailers of various sorts, and furniture-makers (such as Gillow & Co., established in 1769). Street vendors sold tourist souvenirs during this time. 

A plan in Tallis's London Street Views, published in the late 1830s, remarks that almost all the street, save for the far western end, was primarily retail. Peter Robinson opened his draper's shop at 103 Oxford Street in the 1830s; by the 1890s the shop had expanded to fill the entire block between Great Portland Street and Regent Street. Likewise Marshall & Snelgrove opened on Vere Street in 1837; within 40 years it had expanded to fill the entire block between that street and Marylebone Lane, and was housed (from 1870) in a new building designed by Horace Jones and Octavius Hansard.  

What would now be called department stores began to appear on Oxford Street in the 1870s (the rebuilt Marshall & Snelgrove being one of the first). John Lewis started in 1864 in small shop at No. 132; he took on an adjacent property in 1878, and over the next twenty years expanded further and began rebuilding. Dan Harries Evans opened a small draper's shop at No. 147 in 1879; as D H Evans the business swiftly expanded, taking in more than a dozen properties either side of Old Cavendish Street and becoming one of London's largest drapery establishments by the mid-1890s. At the same time, smaller independent retailers continued to thrive alongside their larger counterparts, specialising in all sorts of different goods, trades and services.

Development continued through the first half of the 20th century, with Bourne & Hollingsworth opening in 1902. When Waring & Gillow opened their new store in 1906 it became the first West End store to occupy an entire city block. Selfridges opened on 15 March 1909 at No. 400; it promptly had a 'transformative influence on Britain’s retail scene, elevating the concept of a department store as a social and cultural institution open to everyone, with innovative window dressing, exceptional customer service and masterly advertising'. Shoemakers Lilley & Skinner acquired the lease of 358-60 Oxford Street in 1914; they later expanded into Nos. 356-366, reputedly becoming the world's largest shoe store in 1921. In 1922 C&A purchased Nos. 376-384 (before long C&A had three stores on Oxford Street, which remained the case until their withdrawal from the UK market in 2001).

It is notable that all the aforementioned department stores were or are on the north side of the street. Whether this was down to a preference for south-facing shop fronts, or there being better access routes to the north for deliveries and services, or something akin to coincidence remains an open question. Some large stores were opened on the south side of the street in the 20th century: Woolworths opened its first West End store at No. 311 in 1925, followed by a handful of others in the 1930s (for example Littlewoods, which opened its first Central London store at Nos. 207-213 in 1937, later expanding into Nos. 197-205; it was rebuilt in the early 1960s but closed in the early 2000s). 

By the 1930s the street was almost entirely retail, a state that still obtains today. However, unlike nearby streets such as Bond Street and Park Lane, there remained a seedy element including street traders and prostitutes. Gradually, as the century progressed, the independent retailers began to be replaced by chain stores. 

During the Second World War, Oxford Street was bombed several times. Overnight and in the early hours of 17 to 18 September 1940, 268 Heinkel He 111 and Dornier Do 17 bombers targeted the West End, particularly Oxford Street. Many buildings were damaged, either from direct hits or subsequent fires, including four department stores: John Lewis, Selfridges, Bourne & Hollingsworth and Peter Robinson. George Orwell wrote in his diary for 24 September that Oxford Street was "completely empty of traffic, and only a few pedestrians", and saw "innumerable fragments of broken glass". John Lewis caught fire again on 25 September and was reduced to a shell. It remained a bomb site for the remainder of the war and beyond, finally being demolished and rebuilt between 1958 and 1960. Peter Robinson partially reopened on 22 September, though the main storefront remained boarded up. The basement was converted into studios for the BBC Eastern Service. Orwell made several broadcasts here from 1941 to 1943.

Selfridges was bombed again on 17 April 1941, suffering further damage, including the destruction of the Palm Court Restaurant. The basement was converted to a communications base, with a dedicated line run along Oxford Street to Whitehall allowing British Prime Minister Winston Churchill to make secure and direct telephone calls to the US President Franklin D. Roosevelt. The store was damaged again on 6 December 1944 after a V2 rocket exploded on nearby Duke Street, causing its Christmas tree displays to collapse into the street outside. Damage was repaired, and the shop reopened the following day.

Post-war

After its main store was destroyed, John Lewis operated from properties on the other side of Holles Street (i.e. to the east) until the completion of its new store to the west. Relinquishing these properties then enabled it to purchase the whole of the west site. Subsequently the entire block between Holles Street and John Prince's Street was sold by the Howard de Walden Estate to Land Securities for redevelopment: designed by T. P. Bennett & Partners, it would provide small units of retail accommodation either side of a central flagship department store (namely British Home Stores, until its closure in 2016). Atop the Oxford Street frontage a six-storey block was constructed to house the London College of Fashion, behind which a cluster of taller tower blocks provided office space. Begun in 1959 the work was largely completed within two years; it was one of the largest post-war redevelopment projects to be undertaken in the West End.

In September 1973 a shopping-bag bomb was detonated by the Irish Republican Army (IRA) at the offices of the Prudential Assurance Company, injuring six people. A second bomb was detonated by the IRA next to Selfridges in December 1974, injuring three people and causing £1.5 million worth of damage. Oxford Street was again targeted by the IRA in August 1975; an undiscovered bomb that had been booby trapped exploded without any injuries. On 26 October 1981 Kenneth Howorth, an explosives officer with the Metropolitan Police, was killed while defusing a bomb planted by the IRA in the basement toilet of a Wimpy Bar on Oxford Street. The IRA also detonated a bomb at the John Lewis department store in December 1992, along with another in nearby Cavendish Square, injuring four people.

The human billboard Stanley Green began selling on Oxford Street in 1968, advertising his belief in the link of proteins to sexual libido and the dangers therein. He regularly patrolled the street with a placard headlined "less passion from less protein", and advertised his pamphlet Eight Passion Proteins with Care until his death in 1993. His placards are now housed in the British Museum.

The opening of Britain's first out-of-town shopping centre at Brent Cross in 1976 prompted experiments with mall-style shopping precincts on Oxford Street. West One was developed by the Grosvenor Estate on the corner of Davies Street as part of the rebuilding of Bond Street tube station for the Jubilee Line in 1979; it opened the following year. In 1986 The Plaza shopping centre was opened within the walls of the former Bourne & Hollingsworth department store building (dating from 1925-8), the latter having closed three years earlier. The Plaza itself closed in 2016 and a flagship Next store was opened on the site.

New Oxford Street

New Oxford Street was built in 1847, in accordance with a plan of James Pennethorne, to link the eastern end of Oxford Street with High Holborn. It extends the axis of Oxford Street eastwards from St Giles Circus. Previously, the route into the City of London had deviated southwards at this point, to skirt around the ancient settlement of St Giles with its leper hospital. The building of the new street involved much slum clearance, but did not entirely eradicate the notorious old rookeries. Once a fashionable shopping street, a preponderance of office buildings has led to New Oxford Street no longer sharing the activity or ambience of its namesake; but in its central section a number of original 1840s stuccoed buildings have survived, providing a glimpse of its former character.

Centre Point, at the corner of New Oxford Street and Charing Cross Road, was one of London's first skyscrapers; it was designed by property developer Harry Hyams and opened in 1966. It failed to find a suitable tenant and remained empty for many years before being occupied by squatters who used it as a centre of protest against the lack of suitable accommodation in central London. In 2015, building work began to convert it into residential flats, with development expected to finish in 2017.

Buildings

Oxford Street is home to a number of major department stores and flagship retail outlets, containing over 300 shops as of 2012. It is the most frequently visited shopping street in Inner London, attracting over half a million daily visitors in 2014, and is one of the most popular destinations in London for tourists, with an annual estimated turnover of over £1 billion. It forms part of a shopping district in the West End of London, along with other streets including Covent Garden, Bond Street and Piccadilly.

The New West End Company, formerly the Oxford Street Association, oversees stores and trade along the street; its objective is to make the place safe and desirable for shoppers. The group has been critical of overcrowding and the quality of shops and has clamped down on abusive traders, who were then refused licences.

Several British retail chains regard their Oxford Street branch as the flagship store. In 1919 Marshall & Snelgrove merged with Debenhams (which had opened in nearby Wigmore Street in 1778). The Oxford Street store continued to trade as Marshall & Snelgrove until 1972, when the rebuilt premises were reopened as Debenhams. (Debenhams' flagship Oxford Street store closed in 2021.) 

The London flagship store of House of Fraser began as D. H. Evans in 1879; its current premises were designed by Louis Blanc and opened in 1937. It was the first department store in the UK with escalators serving every floor. It retained the D. H. Evans name until 2001, when it was rebranded as House of Fraser (the name of the parent company). House of Fraser closed in 2022.

Selfridges, Oxford Street, the second-largest department store in the UK and the flagship of the Selfridges chain, has been trading in Oxford Street since 1909. The building was erected in four stages over a twenty-two year period, having been designed by a combination of architects including D. H. Burnham & Company, Frank Atkinson, Sir John Burnet and Thomas Tait. Its construction was influenced by American high rise technology: steel framing and reinforced concrete were employed to create a large and adaptable retail space, and their use was subsequently widely adopted across the UK's high streets. The frontage to Oxford Street was, on completion, the largest shop façade in London.

Marks & Spencer has two stores on Oxford Street. The first, Marks & Spencer Marble Arch, is at the junction with Orchard Street; it was opened in 1930. The second branch, which opened eight years later, is between Regent Street and Tottenham Court Road, on the former site of the Pantheon. Both premises were significantly expanded in the second half of the 20th century.

Topshop was conceived in the 1960s as a youth brand for Peter Robinson, and a sizeable Topshop department was opened within the flagship store on Oxford Street (which had been rebuilt in the 1920s as part of the Oxford Circus improvements). Gradually Topshop took over more of the premises, operating alongside Peter Robinson for a time in the 1970s before the latter brand was withdrawn. It remained Topshop's flagship store until 2021 when (the parent company Arcadia having gone into administration) it closed.

The music retailer HMV was opened at No. 363 Oxford Street in 1921 by Sir Edward Elgar; the premises were twice rebuilt by Joseph Emberton in the moderne style, first in 1935 and then again in 1938-39 (following a fire). The Beatles made their first recording in London in 1962, when they cut a 78 rpm demo disc in the store. As well as music and video retail, the premises supported live gigs in the store. Because of financial difficulties, the store closed in 2014, with all retail moving to No. 363 (which itself closed in 2020).

The 100 Club, in the basement of No. 100, has been run as a live music venue since 24 October 1942. It was thought to be safe from bombing threats because of its underground location, and played host to jazz musicians, including Glenn Miller. It was renamed the London Jazz Club in 1948, and subsequently the Humphrey Lyttelton Club after he took over the lease in the 1950s. Louis Armstrong played at the venue during this time. It became a key venue for the trad jazz revival, hosting gigs by Chris Barber and Acker Bilk. It was renamed the 100 Club in 1964 after Roger Horton bought a stake, adding an alcohol licence for the first time. The venue hosted gigs by several British rock bands, including the Who, the Kinks and the Animals. It was an important venue for punk rock in the UK and hosted the first British punk festival on 21 September 1976, featuring the Sex Pistols, the Damned and the Buzzcocks.

The Flying Horse (formerly The Tottenham) is a Grade II*listed pub at No. 6 Oxford Street, near Tottenham Court Road. It was built in the mid-19th century and is the last remaining pub in the street, which once had 20.

The London College of Fashion has an Oxford Street campus on John Prince's Street near Oxford Circus. The college is part of the University of the Arts London, formerly the London Institute.

The Salvation Army opened Regent Hall, its first Central London venue, at Nos. 275-279 Oxford Street in 1882. It served as a base for poverty relief, street missions and a Salvation Army band. Rebuilt in 1959-60, the hall remains in Salvation Army use.

The cosmetics retailer Lush opened a store in 2015. Measuring  and containing three floors, it is the company's largest retail premises.

Two large hotels dominate the western (Marble Arch) end of the street: the red brick Mount Royal Hotel (now the Amba) was built in 1933-4 to a design by Francis Lorne; while the Portland stone-fronted Cumberland Hotel, by F. J.Wills, opened in 1933 (it was renamed the Hard Rock Hotel in 2018).

Listed buildings
Oxford Street has several Grade II listed buildings. In addition, the façades to Oxford Circus tube station are also listed.

Transport links

Oxford Street is served by major bus routes and by four tube stations of the London Underground. From Marble Arch eastwards, the stations are:
Marble Arch, on the Central line
Bond Street, on the Central line, Jubilee line, and Elizabeth line.
Oxford Circus, on the Central line, Bakerloo line and Victoria line
Tottenham Court Road, on the Central line, Northern line and Elizabeth line.

The four stations serve an average of 100 million passengers every year, with Oxford Circus being the busiest.

The Elizabeth line has two stations serving Oxford Street: at Bond Street and Tottenham Court Road. Each station is "double-ended", with exits through the existing tube station and also some distance away: to the east of Bond Street, in Hanover Square near Oxford Circus; to the west of Tottenham Court Road, in Dean Street.

Traffic

Oxford Street has been ranked as the most important retail location in Britain and the busiest shopping street in Europe. The pavements are congested because of shoppers and tourists, many of whom arrive at a tube station, and the roadway is regularly blocked by buses.

There is heavy competition between foot and bus traffic on Oxford Street, which is the main east–west bus corridor through Central London. Around 175,000 people get on or off a bus on Oxford Street every day, along with 43,000 further through passengers. Taxis are popular, particularly along the stretch between Oxford Circus and Selfridges. Between 2009 and 2012, there were 71 accidents involving traffic and pedestrians.

There have been several proposals to reduce congestion on Oxford Street. Horse-drawn vehicles were banned in 1931, and traffic signals were installed the same year. To prevent congestion of buses, most of Oxford Street is designated a bus lane during peak hours and private vehicles are banned. This is only open to buses, taxis and two-wheeled vehicles between 7:00am and 7:00pm on all days except Sundays. The ban was introduced experimentally in June 1972 and was considered a success, with an estimated increase of £250,000 in retail sales. However, the area is popular with unregulated rickshaws, which are a major cause of congestion in the area. Their slow speed, coupled with the narrowness of the street (buses are unable to pass them, causing long traffic queues), only adds to the traffic woes. In 2009, a new diagonal crossing opened at Oxford Circus, allowing pedestrians to cross from one corner of Oxford Street to the opposite without needing to cross twice or use an underpass. This doubles the pedestrian capacity at the junction.

Pedestrianisation
From 2005 to 2012, Oxford Street was closed to motor traffic on VIP Day, (Very Important Pedestrians), a Saturday before Christmas. The scheme was popular and boosted sales by over £17m in 2012 but in 2013, the New West End Company announced that the scheme would not go ahead as it wanted to do "something new". In 2014, Liberal Democrat members of the London Assembly proposed the street be pedestrianised by 2020.

In 2006, the New West End Company and the Mayor of London, Ken Livingstone, proposed to pedestrianise the street with a tram service running end to end. The next Mayor, Boris Johnson, elected in 2008, announced that the scheme was not cost-effective, was too disruptive and would not go ahead. In response to a request from Johnson, Transport for London (TfL) reduced bus flow by 10% in both 2009 and 2010. The New West End Company called for a 33% reduction in bus movements.

In 2014, TfL suggested that pedestrianisation may not be a suitable long-term measure due to Crossrail reducing the demand for bus services on the street and proposed banning all traffic except buses and cycles during peak shopping times. Optimisation of traffic signals, including pedestrian countdown signals, was also proposed. TfL is concerned that long-term traffic problems may affect trade in the area, which competes with shopping centres such as Westfield London, Westfield Stratford City and the Brent Cross Shopping Centre. In 2015, while campaigning for election as London Mayor, Labour's Sadiq Khan favoured pedestrianisation, which was supported by other parties. After winning the election, he pledged the street would be completely pedestrianised by 2020. In 2017, the project was brought forward to be completed by the end of the following year. The plan has been disapproved by local residents, Westminster City Council and the Fitzrovia Business Association.

Pollution
In 2014, a report by a scientist at King's College London showed that Oxford Street had the world's highest concentration of nitrogen dioxide pollution, at 135 micrograms per cubic metre of air (μg/m3). The figure was an average that included night-time, when traffic was much lower. At peak times during the day, levels up to 463 μg/m3 were recorded – over 11 times the permitted EU maximum of 40 μg/m3. Because of diesel-powered traffic (buses and taxis), annual average nitrogen dioxide concentrations are around 180 μg/m3. This is 4.5 times the EU target of 40 μg/m3 (Council Directive 1999/30/EC).

Crime
Oxford Street has suffered from high crime rates. In 2005, an internal Metropolitan Police report named it as the most dangerous street in Central London. In 2012, an analysis of crime statistics revealed that Oxford Street was the shopping destination most surrounded by crime in the UK. During 2011, there were 656 vehicle crimes, 915 robberies, 2,597 violent crimes and 5,039 reported instances of anti-social behaviour.

In 2014, the United Arab Emirates issued a travel advisory, warning Emirati citizens to avoid Oxford Street and other areas of Central London such as Bond Street and Piccadilly due to "pickpocketing, fraud and theft".  The advent of closed-circuit television has reduced the area's attraction to scam artists and illegal street traders.

In 2021, police seized 17,500 items including fake designer goods, unsafe toys and incorrectly-labelled nicotine products as part of Operation Jade. 4,000 items were removed from an unregistered food trader, including two bags with a quantity of Tetrahydrocannabinol over the legal limit. Trading Standards also took 11,000 goods and 2,500 souvenirs from unlicensed businesses and street traders.

Christmas lights

Every Christmas, Oxford Street is decorated with festive lights. The tradition of Christmas lights began in 1959, five years after neighbouring Regent Street. There were no light displays in 1976 or 1977 because of economic recession, but the lights returned in 1978 when Oxford Street organised a laser display, and have continued every year since.

Current practice involves a celebrity turning the lights on in mid- to late-November, and the lights remain until 6 January (Twelfth Night). The festivities were postponed in 1963 because of the assassination of John F. Kennedy and in 1989 to fit with Kylie Minogue's touring commitments. In 2015, the lights were switched on earlier, on Sunday 1 November, resulting in an unusual closure of the street to all traffic. In 2020, the lights honoured volunteers who had helped London residents through the ongoing COVID-19 pandemic.

Cultural references
Oxford Street is mentioned in several Charles Dickens novels. In A Tale of Two Cities, as Oxford Road, it is described as having "very few buildings", though it was heavily built up by the late 18th century. It is also mentioned in Sketches by Boz and Bleak House. 

Oxford Street is one of the London poet Letitia Elizabeth Landon's Scenes in London. In this poem the busy bustle of commercial life is interrupted by and contrasted with the procession of a military funeral.

The street is a square on the British Monopoly game board, part of the green set (together with Regent Street and Bond Street). The streets were grouped together as they are all primarily retail areas. 

"Oxford St, W1", the B-side to the Television Personalities' 1978 debut single "14th Floor", refers to the street. In 1991, music manager and entrepreneur Malcolm McLaren produced The Ghosts of Oxford Street, a musical documentary about life and history in the local area.

See also

List of eponymous roads in London
Somerset House (demolished 1915), on the corner of Oxford Street and Park Lane

References
Citations

Sources

Further reading

 + New Oxford Street (bird's eye view)

External links

 
Shopping streets in London